Adiala or Adyala(Urdu: اڈیالہ) is a town of Rawalpindi District in the Punjab province of Pakistan. It is located at 33°27'30N 72°59'48E with an altitude of 379 metres (1246 ft), and lies south of the district capital, Rawalpindi. The Central Jail Rawalpindi, also known as Adiala Jail, is located about 4 km away from the Town.

History 
Adiala is the one of the locations where pre-historic artifacts of the Soanian era (ca. 500,000 to 125,000 BP) have been discovered. People belonging to all caste live in Adiala village i.e. Raja, Jatt, Awan, Sayyed, Janjua, Gujjar, Ghauri, Malik, Chowdhry etc. Here and in Khasala about 16 km (9.9 mi) from Rawalpindi, on the bend of the River Soan, hundreds of edged pebble tools were discovered. At Chauntra hand axes and cleavers were found.

References

Rawalpindi Cantonment
Populated places in Rawalpindi Cantonment
Towns in Rawalpindi District